"Missing the Moon" is a single by The Field Mice.  It was released as a 12" vinyl record. It was the group's final proper single release (a live cover of Loop's "Burning World" was later issued as a flexidisc) and marks the culmination of their experiments with electronica, being a heavily synthesised dance pop single. Annemari Davies sings the verses, Bobby Wratten the choruses (with backing vocals by Davies). It was made Single Of The Week in New Musical Express with an enthusiastic review by Ian McCann.

"Missing the Moon" the first 12" single released on Sarah Records.  Interviewed in Melody Maker in 1996 to mark the closure of the label, founder Matt Haynes chose "Missing the Moon" as his favourite Sarah Records release, though he also claimed that many fans of the label "hated" it due to its dance crossover style and use of the 12" format.

The single was voted number 45 in John Peel's Festive Fifty for 1991.

Track listing
12" Single (SARAH 057)
"Missing the Moon" – 7:02
"A Wrong Turn and Raindrops" – 4:21
 "An Earlier Autumn" – 2:02

1991 singles
Sarah Records singles
The Field Mice songs